Swimming at the 2020 Summer Paralympics was held at the Tokyo Aquatics Centre. There were 146 events (76 male, 67 female, 3 mixed relay events) - six fewer events than the 2016 Summer Paralympics. Swimming is the second largest sport: behind athletics and ahead of table tennis.

The 2020 Summer Olympic and Paralympic Games were postponed to 2021 due to the COVID-19 pandemic. They kept the 2020 name and were held from 24 August to 5 September 2021.

Qualification

Qualification starts from 1 October 2018 and finishes on 1 August 2021.

Classes
There are three swimming sport class prefixes for swimming strokes: 
 S is for freestyle, butterfly and backstroke events. 
 SB is for breaststroke
 SM is for individual medley events.

As well as swimming strokes, they are also divided into ten different categories:
 S1/SB1: swimmers who may have tetraplegia or some form of loss of muscular power in their legs, arms and hands. These swimmers would regularly use a wheelchair.
 S2/SB1: swimmers who may have limited function in their hands, but no use of trunk and legs and mainly rely on their arms to swim.
 S3/SB2: swimmers who have leg and arm amputations, have severe coordination problems in their limbs or are able to swim with their arms but don't use their trunk or legs.
 S4/SB3: swimmers who have function in their hands and arms but can't use their trunk or legs to swim or they have three amputated limbs.
 S5/SB4: swimmers who have hemiplegia, paraplegia or short stature.
 S6/SB5: swimmers who have short stature or arm amputations or some form of coordination problem on one side of their body.
 S7/SB6: swimmers who have one leg and one arm amputation on opposite side or paralysis on one side of their body. These swimmers have full control of their arms and trunk but variable function in their legs.
 S8/SB7: swimmers who have a single amputation or restrictive movement in their hip, knee and ankle joints.
 S9/SB8: swimmers who have joint restrictions in one leg or double below-the-knee amputations.
 S10/SB9: swimmers who have minor physical impairments, for example, loss of one hand.
 S11/SB11: swimmers who have severe visual impairments and have very low or no light perception, such as blindness, they are required to wear blackened goggles to compete. They use tappers when competing in swimming events.
 S12/SB12: swimmers who have moderate visual impairment and have a visual field of less than 5 degrees radius. They are required to wear blackened goggles to compete. They may wish to use a tapper.
 S13/SB13: swimmers who have minor visual impairment and have high visual acuity. They are required to wear blackened goggles to compete. They may wish to use a tapper.
 S14/SB14: swimmers who have intellectual impairment.
For relay races, the sum of their individual swimmers' classes must not exceed the stated points total. For example, three S8 swimmers and an S10 swimmer is a valid combination for 34-point freestyle relay (8 + 8 + 8 + 10 = 34).

Qualified nations
As of March 2020.

Schedule

All heat events take place during the morning sessions from 9:00 to 11:45 and the finals take place during the evening sessions from 17:00 to 21:00 on the same day.

Results

Men

Freestyle

Backstroke

Breaststroke

Butterfly

Medley

Women

Freestyle

Backstroke

Breaststroke

Butterfly

Medley

Relays

Freestyle

Medley

Medal table
Source:

Multiple medalists

See also
Swimming at the 2020 Summer Olympics

References

External links
Results book 

2020 Summer Paralympics events
2020
Paralympics
Swimming competitions in Japan